Malik Jones may refer to:
 Malik Yusef or Malik Jones, American spoken word artist and songwriter
 Malik Jones (sledge hockey), American ice sledge hockey player